The 2012 South Sydney Rabbitohs season was the 103rd in the club's history. They competed in the NRL's 2012 Telstra Premiersip under rookie coach Michael Maguire and finished the regular season 3rd (out of 16), Having made the finals for the 2nd since 1989, the Rabbitohs then came to within one game of the 2012 NRL Grand final but were knocked out of contention by eventual grand finalists the Canterbury-Bankstown Bulldogs.

Pre-season

The Rabbitohs played three pre-season games in 2012. The Rabbitohs were initially planned to play the Cronulla-Sutherland Sharks at the fourth annual Return to Redfern, then the Warrington Wolves in Coffs Harbour. However, due to a scheduling clash with Warrington's first season match, the games were rescheduled.

The changes meant the clash with Warrington would need to be in late January, and Redfern Oval played host to its first international match in the re-developed configuration. At the clash, in front of a sold-out crowd, the head coach, Michael Maguire announced the new captaincy arrangement, and presented the 2012 squad. On the field, Warrington held onto a late comeback by South Sydney to win 34 points to 28.

A fortnight later, at the conclusion of the annual 'Camp Rabbitoh' pre-season training camp in Coffs Harbour, the Rabbitohs played the 2011 Grand Finalists, the New Zealand Warriors, in which South Sydney were again beaten by 8 points.

In the final pre-season clash, the Rabbitohs took on the St. George Illawarra Dragons in the annual Charity Shield clash at ANZ Stadium. The match, in which South Sydney were defeated by 6 points, drew over 21,000 fans, and was again the only pre-season clash to be televised.

Regular season

While the Rabbitohs got off to a rocky start to 2012 under new coach Michael Maguire, losing 3 of their first 4 games. With the heir-apparent to the fullback position, Nathan Merritt, out for the first 7 rounds, and a struggling Dylan Farrell playing out of position, coach Maguire moved Greg Inglis to fullback in the 40–24 thrashing of Penrith, setting their season alight. From the next 17 games, South Sydney managed to lose only 4, and all bar one were closely fought losses, won in the dying minutes of the game.

In Round 19, South Sydney fought out one of the wins of the season, pipping the Sydney Roosters with 2 back-to-back tries within the last 3 minutes of the game, a feat which the Roosters had pulled in Round 1 over South Sydney. The team experienced a minor hiccup losing back-to-back games in Round 23/24 for only the second time all year. South Sydney bounced back however, with an inspiring victory over the Parramatta Eels in which Greg Inglis posted one of the best individual performances of all time, as measured by Sportsdata's CVR Ratings. The Rabbitohs then wrapped up their first Top 4 spot since 1989 with a win over Newcastle.

Finals Series

After finishing the season proper in third place, the Rabbitohs travelled to Melbourne to take on the second placed Storm. Souths put in an uncharacteristically poor performance, with Melbourne rolling Souths 24–6, with the only Rabbitohs try going to forward Eddy Pettybourne, for his first try of the year.
Despite the loss, South Sydney proceeded through to an Elimination final against the Canberra Raiders at ANZ Stadium. Against a home crowd, Souths turned in a dominant performance, piling on 38 points; tries going to Adam Reynolds, Sam Burgess, Dylan Farrell, and a double to Andrew Everingham. Additionally, a rare penalty try was awarded to Greg Inglis, after Canberra's Blake Ferguson tackled Inglis without the ball as he was about to receive an offload from forward Luke Burgess. During the game, halfback and Rookie of the Year Adam Reynolds kicked 7/8 goals to become only the second South Sydney player to score more than 200 points in a season.
Souths then moved on to a Grand Final Qualifier against the Canterbury-Bankstown Bulldogs, played in front of a bumper crowd of more than 70,000. The Rabbitohs scored their only try through Issac Luke, however after halfback Adam Reynolds left the field with a hamstring injury, the momentum of the game swung and the Bulldogs surged ahead to end the Rabbitohs season.

Ladder

Statistics

Transfers
Gains

Losses

Current squad
The following list comprises players who are in the Rabbitohs full-time first-grade squad for the 2012 season in the NRL Telstra Premiership.

Player statistics

Representative honours

References

South Sydney Rabbitohs seasons
South Sydney Rabbitohs season